The 1955–56  Kansas Jayhawks men's basketball team represented the University of Kansas during the 1955–56 college men's basketball season. The Jayhawks played their home games at Allen Fieldhouse, their first full season playing at the arena. It was the 39th and final season under head coach Phog Allen, who was forced to retire after the season. The Jayhawks finished the season 14–9 overall and 6–6 in the Big Seven Conference and did not qualify for the NCAA Tournament.

Roster
Maurice King
Gene Elstun
Dallas Dobbs
Lew Johnson
Ron Johnston
Bill Brainard
John Parker
Eddie Dater
Lee Green
Bob Lockley
John Cleland
Harry Jett
Blaine Hollinger
Jim Toft
Gary Mowry
Mark Boxberger

Schedule

References

Kansas Jayhawks men's basketball seasons
Kansas
Kansas
Kansas